Julius Bergmann (1 April 1839, in Opherdike, Westphalia – 24 August 1904, in Marburg) was a German philosopher.

Biography
At the University of Göttingen and at the Humboldt University of Berlin, he devoted himself to mathematics and philosophy, was appointed to the chair of philosophy at the University of Königsberg in 1872, and three years later to a similar chair at the University of Marburg.

Works
Among his more important writings are:
Grundlinien einer Theorie des Bewusstseins (Outlines of a theory of consciousness, 1870)
 Zur Beurteilung des Kriticismus (On judging criticism, 1875)
 Reine Logik (Pure logic, 1879)
 Sein und Erkennen (To be and to recognize, 1880)
 Die Grundprobleme der Logik (Fundamental problems in logic, 1882)
 Geschichte der Philosophie (History of philosophy, 1892–94)
 Untersuchungen über Hauptpunkte der Philosophie (Investigations on the main points of philosophy, 1900)
 System des objektiven Idealismus (A system of objective idealism, 1903)

References

External links
 

1839 births
1904 deaths
19th-century German philosophers
Humboldt University of Berlin alumni
People from the Province of Westphalia
People from Unna (district)
University of Göttingen alumni
Academic staff of the University of Königsberg
Academic staff of the University of Marburg
German male writers
20th-century German philosophers